Paula Jean Welden (born October 19, 1928; disappeared December 1, 1946) was an American college student who disappeared while walking on Vermont's Long Trail hiking route. Local sheriffs were criticized for errors made in the investigation, which led to the creation of the Vermont State Police. Welden's fate remains unsolved, and was one of several unexplained disappearances in the same area at the time.

Background
Paula Jean Welden was the eldest of four daughters of the well-known industrial engineer, architect and designer William Archibald Welden (1900–1970) and his wife Jean Douglas (née Wilson; 1901-1976) of Brookdale Road, Stamford, Connecticut. Employed by the Revere Copper and Brass Company, Welden's father was the designer of many familiar household utensils, as well as stylish cocktail shakers and other objects. Welden was a 1945 graduate of Stamford High School.

Bennington College
In 1946, Welden was a sophomore at Bennington College in North Bennington, Vermont. Her college dormitory was Dewey House, one of the older dormitories on the college grounds, and which remains standing to this day. One day, Welden resolved to find and walk a portion of the Long Trail, a hiking route located a few miles from the campus. She tried to get some other students to join her that day, but they were busy; she ventured onto the trail by herself.

Long Trail
After finishing her shift in the Bennington College dining hall, Welden returned to her room and changed into walking clothes. Her clothing was adequate for the weather that afternoon but not for the anticipated drop in temperature that night. She packed no bag, took no extra clothing, and did not take any extra money. From all appearances, she did not expect to be gone more than a few hours. 

Welden walked down the campus driveway and hitched a ride from State Route 67A near the college entrance to a point on State Route 9 near the Furnace Bridge, between downtown Bennington and Woodford Hollow. From this point, Welden either hitchhiked or walked the rest of the way to the start of the trail in Woodford Hollow.

A group of hikers were walking down the trail as Welden was walking up. She approached them and asked them a few questions about the Long Trail. Welden continued walking in a northerly direction on the road portion of the trail now known as Harbour Road. She was on the trail late in the afternoon and darkness was falling as she approached the end of Harbour Road. She may have continued into quickly darkening woods. It was presumed that she must have continued her walk along the Bolles Brook valley, although there are no known confirmed sightings of her past the Fay Fuller Camp.

Search

Welden did not return to campus. Her roommate thought she must have gone to the library to study for exams, but the next morning Welden still had not returned. Once the college administrators were notified, they immediately started a search of the campus itself. The Bennington County state's attorney was notified, and the county sheriff was brought in to help with the search. Over the next couple of days, Welden's visit to the Long Trail was discovered when one of the hikers she had approached identified her from the photo in the Bennington Banner newspaper, where he worked.

Weeks of searching ensued. Bennington College closed for several days, and students and faculty participated in organized searches. Hundreds of volunteers, family members, National Guard troops, and firefighters searched for Welden to no avail. Ground and air searches concentrated on the Long Trail up as far as Glastenbury Mountain (ten miles to the north), the trail's various branches, and along Route 9 from Bennington to Brattleboro. Most of those searching assumed Welden had gotten lost in the woods. When no clues were found as to her whereabouts, other theories started to be considered.

Connecticut State Police investigation
Alternative theories speculated that Welden had been in unusually high spirits and had decided to run away to start a new life, was going to meet a secret lover and eloped with him, or had become injured and suffered from amnesia. Darker theories speculated that Welden was depressed and may have committed suicide, or that she had been kidnapped or murdered.

At the time of Welden's disappearance, there was no state police organization in Vermont, and the state's attorney, county sheriff and state investigator Almo Franzoni were responsible for finding clues. Welden's father pressed the investigators and Governor Mortimer R. Proctor to bring in additional professional law enforcement help. Proctor asked Governor Raymond E. Baldwin of Connecticut to lend assistance. Connecticut State Police detective Robert Rundle and state policewoman Dorothy Scoville were assigned to the case. They interviewed every person who saw, or thought they saw, Welden, and every person who lived along the route she took or who were simply in the vicinity of the Long Trail on that December afternoon.

Investigators discovered that one of the last people to see Welden alive was a lumberjack named Fred Gadette, who lived along Harbour Road. Gadette was in the midst of an argument with his girlfriend when Welden walked by. He stormed off in a jealous rage shortly thereafter and, depending on different statements he made, went to his shack and spent the evening by himself or he drove up the travel portion of the trail (where Welden was heading). He lied to police on several occasions and was a person of interest, both in 1946 and when the case was revisited in 1952. Reportedly, Gadette told at least two people that he knew within a hundred feet where Welden was buried, but later claimed it was just idle talk. When no evidence was found that a crime had been committed, no body was discovered, and no forensic clues were identified, this avenue of the investigation ended.

Aftermath
The manner in which Welden's disappearance was handled by local law enforcement was sharply criticized by her father and many others. Welden's father pointed out that the lack of a statewide law enforcement organization and the lack of training of local sheriffs contributed to a poorly run investigation. Within seven months of Welden's disappearance, the Vermont legislature created the Vermont State Police.

Other cases
In the same general area where Welden disappeared, at least four other unexplained vanishings were reported to have taken place between 1945 and 1950. Due to the strangeness of these events, Vermont broadcaster and author Joseph A. Citro dubbed the wilderness area northeast of Bennington "the Bennington Triangle" – a reference to unexplained disappearances in the Bermuda Triangle.

In literature
 Author Shirley Jackson (1916–1965) was possibly inspired by Welden's vanishing when she wrote her novel Hangsaman (1951), as indicated by Jackson's papers in the Library of Congress. At the time of Welden's disappearance in 1946, Jackson was living in North Bennington, where her husband was employed at Bennington College. Jackson's short story "The Missing Girl", included in Just An Ordinary Day (the 1996 collection of her previously unpublished/uncollected short stories), also references the Welden case.

 Author Hillary Waugh's novel Last Seen Wearing..., about the police investigation into the disappearance of co-ed Marilyn Lowell Mitchell from Parker College in Bristol, Massachusetts (modeled on Smith College in Northampton, Massachusetts), is generally acknowledged to have been inspired by, if not directly based on, Welden's disappearance.

See also
Bennington Triangle
List of people who disappeared

References

External links

Paula Jean Welden at the Charley Project

1928 births
1946 in Vermont
1940s missing person cases
20th-century American people
20th-century American women
Bennington College alumni
Missing people
Missing person cases in Vermont
People declared dead in absentia
People from Stamford, Connecticut
Year of death uncertain
Stamford High School (Stamford, Connecticut) alumni
Women in Vermont